A Whole Lot of Nothing is the fourth  studio album by Swedish rap metal band Clawfinger, released on 23 July 2001 through Supersonic Records.

The music uses the same aggressive guitar sounds, with more distortion effects, adding a whole new level of diversification. The synthesizers are more present than on any of Clawfinger's other works.

Track listing

Credits 
Backing Vocals [Additional] – Henrik Batte Ohlsson (tracks: 6)
Bass [Additional] – André Skaug
Drums [Additional] – Henka Johansson, Ricard Nettermalm
Engineer [Basic Tracking] – Ulf Kruckenberg
Management – Petri H. Lundén
Mastered By – Björn Engelmann
Mixed By – Stefan Glaumann
Music By, Lyrics By – Currie (tracks: 13), Allen (tracks: 13), Clawfinger (tracks: 1 to 12), Ure (tracks: 13), Cann (tracks: 13)
Other [Booking] – Jim Morewood
Other [Coordination] – Caroline Kugelberg
Producer – Jacob Hellner
Producer [With] – Clawfinger

References 

Clawfinger albums
2001 albums